Lisa Reynolds is an American physician and politician. Since 2021, she serves as a member of the Oregon House of Representatives from the 36th district, which contains downtown Portland and other parts of the western side of the city.

Early life and family 
Reynolds was born and raised in suburban Chicago. Her father Charlie Reynolds was a roofer and her mother Phyllis was an activist. Her mother instilled the importance of education and graduated from college at the age of 40. She has one sister and two brothers. One of her brothers, Pat, suffers from schizophrenia.

Career 
Reynolds earned an undergraduate degree from the University of Chicago and a medical degree from the UCLA School of Medicine. Reynolds was a pediatric resident at Ronald Reagan UCLA Medical Center from 1991–94 and was chief resident in pediatrics at Legacy Emanuel Children's Hospital from 1994-95.

Electoral history

References

External links

Democratic Party members of the Oregon House of Representatives
Women state legislators in Oregon
Living people
Year of birth missing (living people)
University of Chicago alumni
David Geffen School of Medicine at UCLA alumni
21st-century American politicians
21st-century American women politicians
Politicians from Chicago